Samuel Douglas (1781 – July 8, 1833) was a Pennsylvania lawyer and state Attorney General.

Personal life and career
Douglas was born in Ireland, the son of Henry Douglas and Jane Blair, a descendant of the Scottish warlord known as the "Black Douglas". He was educated in Scotland, and came to America when he was about seventeen.  He joined his older brother, the Reverend Joseph Douglas, who was living in Pittsburgh.  Douglas studied law and was admitted to the bar in 1804.

In 1817, Douglas ran for Congress against Henry Baldwin and lost.  That year he moved to Harrisburg, where he met Louisa Wyeth, whom he married shortly afterwards.

In 1819, Douglas was appointed Deputy Attorney General for Dauphin County.  He was appointed Attorney General in 1830.  His term ended in 1833, and he died that summer.

References

Further reading
 
 

1781 births
1833 deaths
People from County Londonderry
Pennsylvania Attorneys General
19th-century American politicians